Hamorton Historic District is a national historic district in the center of Hamorton, Kennett Township, Chester County, Pennsylvania, United States. It encompasses 75 contributing buildings and 1 contributing structure in the crossroads community of Hamorton. It largely consists of a variety of stone, brick, and frame  residences built between 1780 and 1930.  The village was laid out in the 1830s and developed as a company town in the early 20th century by Pierre S. du Pont (1870–1954).

It was added to the National Register of Historic Places in 1990.

References

Historic districts on the National Register of Historic Places in Pennsylvania
Historic districts in Chester County, Pennsylvania
National Register of Historic Places in Chester County, Pennsylvania